Abdullahi Sheikh Ismail (died 7 May 2021) was a Somali politician.

Abdulahi belongs to the Biimal clan of Dir. he worked as Translator to Somali parliament in 1960s, Somalia’s Ambassador to Tunis, and was later a member of SSNM front.
 He previously served as a Deputy Prime Minister, as well as a Minister of Foreign Affairs in the Transitional Federal Government of Somalia. On 12 January 2015, Ismail was appointed the new Minister of Transport of the Federal Government of Somalia by Prime Minister Omar Abdirashid Ali Sharmarke. He was 1st secretary, embassy, Cairo 1972. Ismacil was  Consular (Belgium) & Amb to Yemen, USSR, Arab League, Tunis, 1978-1988. He became Deputy PM & Foreign Minister Before being appointed as the Chair of Somalia-Somaliland talks. He spoke Somali, Arabic, English and Italian.

References

2021 deaths
Ethnic Somali people
Government ministers of Somalia
Members of the Transitional Federal Parliament
Ambassadors of Somalia to Russia
Somalian diplomats
1940 births